DuraSpace was a 501(c)(3) not-for-profit organization founded in 2009 when the Fedora Commons organization and the DSpace Foundation, two of the largest providers of open source repository software for managing and providing access to digital content, joined their organizations. In July 2019 DuraSpace merged with LYRASIS, becoming a division of that organization.

The DuraSpace portfolio of open source technologies is developed by librarians, archivists, technologists and researchers. For stewards of knowledge open source software has several important advantages over proprietary software. Open source is developed through free sharing and the transparent exchange of ideas and resources among peers. DSpace and Fedora communities have used this process to build software platforms for repositories in more than 1,500 institutions in over 100 countries.

DuraCloud is a new service and open source technology for managing content in the cloud that was launched by DuraSpace in 2011. DuraCloud makes use of commercial cloud infrastructure to provide organizations with tools for archiving content across multiple cloud providers to ensure that documents, imagery and videos are always backed-up. DuraCloud features built-in compute services for digital preservation, data access, transformation, and sharing. Institutions including University of Michigan ICPSR, Columbia University, Massachusetts Institute of Technology, Northwestern University, State of North Carolina Library and Archives use DuraCloud to preserve digital resources.

History
DuraSpace collaborates with open source software projects, academics, technologists, curators and related commercial partners to create innovative, interoperable technologies and open standards and protocols that share an interest in preserving digital scholarship and culture.

In January 2019 LYRASIS and DuraSpace announced their intention to merge. This is the second time the two organizations have planned a merger. This second attempt was successful, and in July 2019 DuraSpace became a division of LYRASIS with responsibility for community developed software programs.

Technology
The DuraSpace open technology software portfolio crosses the boundaries of institutional systems, the Web, and cloud infrastructure and provides software solutions that address requirements of both data curation and long-term preservation.

 DSpace is a turn-key application for managing and providing access to digital content in an open access repository most often used as an open access repository for managing faculty and student output.
 Fedora is a modular repository platform for the management and dissemination of digital content in the form of digital objects. Fedora repository software is used by libraries, archives and research projects to preserve and provide specialized types of access to very large and complex aggregations of historic and cultural images, artifacts, text, media, datasets, and documents.
 DuraCloud is a hosted service and open technology that uses commercial cloud infrastructure to provide preservation support and access services for academic libraries, academic research centers, and other cultural heritage organizations.
 VIVO is a linked data application for research discovery.

Supporting organization
The DuraSpace organization receives financial support from organizations that use DSpace, Fedora and DuraCloud open source software. DuraSpace does not receive significant funding from government agencies or private foundations. 154 organizations contributed at one of four levels of financial support in years 2017/18 becoming members of DuraSpace.

DuraSpace in turn provides the user community with tools, services, and leadership in support of the ongoing development of open source technologies news and information, publications, education and professional development services, and community mailing lists/forums.

See also
 Digital asset management
 Content management system
 Digital library
 Digital preservation
 Institutional repository
 Open-source software

References

Further reading
 Ashenfelder, M., Interview: Conversations About Digital Preservation: Michele Kimpton, Chief Executive Officer at DuraSpace, podcast. Library of Congress. March 2011. Michele Kimpton: Digital Preservation (Podcasts) (Library of Congress)
 Hane, P. J. (ed.), Library of Congress and DuraSpace Launch Cloud Technologies Pilot Program. Information Today Newsbreaks. July 16, 2009. Library of Congress and DuraSpace Launch Cloud Technologies Pilot Program
 Kimpton, M., Markow, J., Sustaining Open Source Projects: An Update from DuraSpace. CNI Spring 2012 Project Briefings, conference proceedings: April 2–3, 2012. Sustaining Open Source Projects: An Update from DuraSpace
 Price, G., Digital Preservation: DuraSpace Offers DuraCloud Access To Internet2 Members. Library Journal Info Docket. April 26, 2012. Digital Preservation: DuraSpace Offers DuraCloud Access To Internet2 Members
 Rose, F., Interview: Library of Congress: Testing the Cloud, podcast. Federal News Radio. July 16, 2009. Federal News Network | Breaking Federal News & Information | Helping feds meet their mission.

Charities based in Oregon